Khrenovina sauce (Russian: хреновина) is a spicy horseradish sauce served with a main course, popular in Siberia. It is prepared by blending fresh tomatoes, horseradish, garlic and salt. Ground black pepper, ground paprika, sweet bell pepper, vinegar, and sugar may also be added. It may be served with traditional Russian meat dishes, including pelmeni.

The sauce is sometimes also called khrenodyor (radish-throttler), gorlodyor (throat-throttler), vyrviglaz (yank-out-the-eye) or flame. 

The sauce can be kept in a refrigerator for a long time without preservatives if stored in a sealed jar. Increasing the amount of horseradish and garlic used extends the length of time for which it can be stored.

See also
 Chrain
 List of Russian dishes
 Wasabi

References

External links
 See "coyc.ru" for more about spicy horseradish sauce.
 Cook at Home

Asian cuisine
Russian cuisine
Sauces
Tomato sauces
Horseradish (condiment)
Garlic dishes
Spicy foods